Maxim (stylized in all caps) is an international men's magazine, devised and launched in the UK in 1995, but based in New York City since 1997, and prominent for its photography of actors, singers, and female models whose careers are at a current peak.  Maxim has a circulation of about 9 million readers each month. Maxim Digital reaches more than 4 million unique viewers each month. Maxim magazine publishes 16 editions, sold in 75 countries worldwide.

History
Maxim was founded by Felix Dennis (1947–2014) in 1995 and expanded to the United States in 1997.

Maxim has expanded into many other countries, including Australia.

In 1999, MaximOnline.com (now maxim.com) was created. It contains content not included in the print version, and focuses on the same general topics, along with exclusive sections such as the "Girls of Maxim" galleries and the "Joke of the Day". "Maxim Video" contains video clips of interviews, music videos, photo shoots, and original content.

On December 2001, Editorial Televisa published the Spanish-language edition of Maxim magazine for Latin America and the Hispanic communities of the United States, its first cover was Colombian model and actress Sofía Vergara. In 2002, it expanded to the film industry with a first look deal at New Line Cinema.

On February 5, 2005, Maxim Radio, featuring male-oriented talk programming, debuted on Sirius Satellite Radio. Following the Sirius-XM merger in late 2008, the Maxim brand was dropped, and the channel is now known as Sirius XM Stars Too.

Since 2005, in Argentina, the Argentinian edition of Maxim magazine began to adapt and approximate the styles of the American adult magazines Penthouse and Hustler, publishing photos of Argentinian models in thongs and topless.

On June 5, 2006, the magazine announced plans to build a casino on the Las Vegas Strip north of Circus Circus, but the casino plan failed after local condominium owners complained that the proposed casino would ruin their view. The land was sold to MGM Mirage.

On June 15, 2007, private equity firm Quadrangle Group, along with long-time media executive Kent Brownridge, announced the acquisition of the parent company of Maxim, Blender, Stuff, and MaximOnline.com in the United States, under the name Alpha Media Group. As of April 23, 2009, Dennis Publishing has announced that it will no longer produce a print edition of Maxim in the UK, though the website for the UK version will remain.

In July 2009, Maxim partnered with the UFC for the first-ever Maxim UFC Octagon Girl Search at the UFC Fan Expo; 40 girls participated in the contest, and the winner was Natasha Wicks.

Quadrangle Group gave up on its investment in Alpha Media Group in August 2009, making Cerberus Capital Management the majority partner. In 2013, Alpha announced the sale of Maxim to the newly created Darden Media Group, but Darden was unable to raise the money. Calvin Darden Jr. was later charged with fraud relating to the transaction.

Between 2010 and 2012, Maxim eliminated two issues, going from 12 issues a year to 10, and decreased its circulation numbers by 20%, from a reported 2.5 million to only 2.0 million.

Maximum Warrior debuted in 2011, as an online reality competition that tests 10 of America's most elite military operators in 10 military-inspired challenges. The videos are available online and on the Maxim app on Xbox Live. Several episodes feature Dakota Meyer, Maxims military advisor. Maximum Warrior is produced by Grand Street Media.

The Argentinian edition of the magazine Maxim stopped circulating in March 2013 in Argentina and its last cover was the Argentinian model Valeria Degenaro.

On February 27, 2014, entrepreneur Sardar Biglari, the founder of Biglari Holdings and Biglari Capital, purchased Maxim. "We plan to build the business on multiple dimensions," he said at the time, "thereby energizing our readership and viewership." In September 2014, he hired Kate Lanphear, former style director of Elle and T: The New York Times Style Magazine, as editor, in an attempt to remake it as a luxury, lifestyle, and fashion journal, at an annual salary that was thought to be more than $700,000. During Lanphear's tenure, the September 2015 issue featured actor Idris Elba on its cover, marking the first time that the magazine did not have a woman on the cover. Lanphear left the magazine in November 2015.

In January 2016, Biglari officially took over as editor-in-chief of Maxim, though a Maxim staffer said that the new masthead title just formalized what had always been clear since Biglari's purchase; Biglari exercises full editorial control over Maxim. At one point in 2015, the staffer said, Biglari decided to throw out a nearly complete version of the December issue to completely redesign the magazine. On January 13, 2016, Gilles Bensimon joined Biglari as a special creative director. "What drew me to Maxim was Sardar's vision for the brand," said Bensimon.

The Indonesian edition of the magazine Maxim stopped circulating in August 2017 in Indonesia and its last cover was the Australian model Jessica Gomes.

MaximBet
In April 2021, Maxim collaborated with international sports betting operator, Carousel Group, to create MaximBet, a licensed iGaming and sports betting services provider. In September 2021, MaximBet made its debut in Colorado, when they partnered with Johnny Nolon's Saloon and Gambling Emporium. In late September 2021, MaximBet expanded its operations and its brand launched in Indiana.

In October 2021, MaximBet hosted a private event at the Wings Over the Rockies Air and Space Museum featuring performances by Fat Joe and Cheat Codes. In December 2021, MaximBet lend aid toward the Colorado wildfire relief by donating $10,000.

In April 2022, just after the Major League Baseball lockout ended, MaximBet entered into an endorsement deal with an active MLB player, Charlie Blackmon of the Colorado Rockies, as a brand ambassador.

In May 2022, Nicki Minaj was named as the creative director and global ambassador of MaximBet.

Events and controversies 

In 2004, the Gender Issues Centre, an on-campus feminist organization at Lakehead University in Thunder Bay, Ontario, protested an on-campus "Thunder Bay Boob Idol" event sponsored by Maxim and Coors Light. The Centre described Maxim as consisting of "sexist bravado and racist imagery". In 2006, Alok Jha of The Guardian criticized Maxim for encouraging excessive alcohol consumption and sexual objectification of women.

In June 2007, Israeli diplomat David Saranga invited Maxim to the country.  In what came to be known as "beers and babes", the magazine did photo shoots of near-naked Israeli women who serve in the army.  The campaign drew an angry reaction from lawmaker Colette Avital, a former diplomat who served as Israel's consul-general in New York City in the 1990s. Prof. John H. Brown of Georgetown University described the spread as the first event in a new branch of public diplomacy.

In February 2008, Maxim was criticized by The Black Crowes for rating their upcoming CD, Warpaint, without hearing the entire album. Black Crowes manager Pete Angelus said, "Maxims actions seem to completely lack journalistic integrity and intentionally mislead their readership." According to Crowes, the magazine stated in an email, "Of course, we always prefer to  hearing music, but sometimes there are big albums that we don’t want to ignore that aren’t available to hear, which is what happened with the Crowes. It’s either an educated guess preview or no coverage at all, so in this case we chose the former." The magazine's editorial director James Kaminsky later apologized, stating, "It is Maxim's editorial policy to assign star ratings only to those albums that have been heard in their entirety. Unfortunately, that policy was not followed in the March 2008 issue of our magazine and we apologize to our readers." Facing more criticism over rating albums without listening to them, Maxim magazine maintains it was previewing CDs in its March 2008 issue, not reviewing them, and the mistake was to include star ratings.

In December 2019, Presto Media Productions, criticized the "Maxim Cover Girl 2019" competition with an independent documentary created by model, actor, and producer Valentina Lucia Faltoni. Her documentary is visible on Vimeo and it is titled: "The Ugly $ide of Beauty Conte$t$"

International editions

Maxim has launched international editions of its magazines since 1995. Most recently, it has launched its 26th and 27th international editions in Serbia and Greece, where it is published by Attica Media. Notably, the magazine has been circulating editions in South Korea, Indonesia (defunct), India (defunct), Japan, Portugal (as Maxmen), the United States, Thailand, France (as Maximal), Russia, Turkey, Serbia, Greece, Bulgaria, Czech Republic, Argentina, Italy, Canada, Poland, Brazil, Germany, Australia, Mexico, and the Philippines (defunct).

Celebrity profiles

Maxim Hot 100 
Each year since 2000, Maxim has released the Maxim Hot 100. The winners and their corresponding ages and the year in which the magazine was released are listed below.

From 2000 until 2015, Maxim released the rest of the Hot 100 in order. Since 2016, Maxim released the rest of the hot 100 in random order, so those lists are by default sorted alphabetically on this table. These are the rest of the Top 100 each year.

See also 
 Glamour photography
 List of men's magazines
 Maxim Radio
 Dennis Digital

References 

zimbio.com

External links 

 Maxim U.S. site
 Maxim U.K. site

1995 establishments in the United Kingdom
1998 establishments in the United States
2009 disestablishments in the United Kingdom
Men's magazines published in the United States
Monthly magazines published in the United States
Men's magazines published in the United Kingdom
Defunct magazines published in the United Kingdom
Magazines established in 1995
Magazines disestablished in 2009
Magazines published in New York City
2014 mergers and acquisitions

pt:Maxim (revista)